This chronological list of popes corresponds to that given in the Annuario Pontificio under the heading "I Sommi Pontefici Romani" (The Roman Supreme Pontiffs), excluding those that are explicitly indicated as antipopes. Published every year by the Roman Curia, the Annuario Pontificio no longer identifies popes by regnal number, stating that it is impossible to decide which pope represented the legitimate succession at various times. The 2001 edition of the Annuario Pontificio introduced "almost 200 corrections to its existing biographies of the popes, from St Peter to John Paul II". The corrections concerned dates, especially in the first two centuries, birthplaces and the family name of one pope.

The term pope is used in several churches to denote their high spiritual leaders (for example Coptic pope). This title in English usage usually refers to the head of the Catholic Church. The Catholic pope uses various titles by tradition, including Summus Pontifex, Pontifex Maximus, and Servus servorum Dei. Each title has been added by unique historical events and unlike other papal prerogatives, is not incapable of modification.

Hermannus Contractus may have been the first historian to number the popes continuously. His list ends in 1049 with Leo IX as number 154. Several changes were made to the list during the 20th century. Christopher was considered a legitimate pope for a long time but was removed due to how he obtained the papacy. Pope-elect Stephen was listed as Stephen II until the 1961 edition, when his name was removed. The decisions of the Council of Pisa (1409) were reversed in 1963 in a reinterpretation of the Western Schism, extending Gregory XII's pontificate to 1415 and classifying rival claimants Alexander V and John XXIII as antipopes.

A significant number of these popes have been recognized as saints, including 48 out of the first 50 consecutive popes, and others are in the sainthood process. Of the first 31 popes, 28 died as martyrs.

Chronological list of popes

1st millennium

1st century

2nd century 

|- style="vertical-align:top; background:#ccc;"
| style="text-align:center;" | —
| c. 199 –c. 200
| Natalius
| style="font-size:85%"|Rome, Italia, Roman Empire
| style="font-size:85%"|—
| style="font-size:85%"|Roman. In opposition to pope Zephyrinus. Later reconciled.

3rd century 

|-  style="vertical-align:top; background:#ccc;"
| style="text-align:center;" | —
| 217 –235
| St Hippolytus
| style="font-size:85%"|c. 170 AD Asia Minor, Roman Empire
| style="font-size:85%"|47 / 65
| style="font-size:85%"|Greek. In opposition to Callixtus I, Urban I and Pontian. Later reconciled with Pontian (see below).

|-  style="vertical-align:top; background:#ccc;"
| style="text-align:center;" | —
| March 251 –258
| Novatian
| style="font-size:85%"|c. 200–20 AD Rome, Italia, Roman Empire
| style="font-size:85%"|31–51 / 38–58
|style="font-size:85%"| Roman. Founder of Novatianism. In opposition to Cornelius, Lucius I, Stephen I and Sixtus II.

4th century 

|-  style="vertical-align:top; background:#ccc;"
| style="text-align:center;" | —
| 355 –22 November 365
| Felix II
| style="font-size:85%"|c. 300 AD Rome, Italy, Roman Empire
| style="font-size:85%"|55 / 65
|style="font-size:85%"| Roman. In opposition to Pope Liberius. Installed by Arian-leaning Emperor Constantius II.

|-  style="vertical-align:top; background:#ccc;"
| style="text-align:center;" | —
| 1 October 366 –16 November 367
| Ursinus
| style="font-size:85%"|Rome, Italy, Roman Empire
| style="font-size:85%"|—
|style="font-size:85%"| Roman. In opposition to Damasus I. Banished to Gallia by Emperor Valentinian II after a war between two sects and died after 384.

5th century 

|-  style="vertical-align:top; background:#ccc;"
| style="text-align:center;" | —
| 27 December 418 –3 April 419
| Eulalius
| style="font-size:85%"|c. 350–80 AD Rome, Italy, Roman Empire
| style="font-size:85%"|68–38 / 69–39 (†72–42)
|style="font-size:85%"| Roman. In opposition to Pope Boniface I. Elected on the eve of the election of Boniface, first benefited from the support of the emperor Honorius, but lost it quickly. Exiled in Campania, and died in 423.

|-  style="vertical-align:top; background:#ccc;"
| style="text-align:center;" | —
| 22 November 498 –Aug 506/8
| Laurence
| style="font-size:85%"|c. 460 AD Rome, Italy, Western Roman Empire
| style="font-size:85%"|38 / 46 (†48)
|style="font-size:85%"| Roman. In opposition to Symmachus. Elected on the same day as Symachus, King Theodoric settled in favor of his adversary. Took control of Rome in 501 and remained pope in fact until he died in 506/08.

6th century 

|-  style="vertical-align:top; background:#ccc;"
| style="text-align:center;" | —
| 22 September 530 –14 October 530
| Dioscore
| style="font-size:85%"|Alexandria, Aegyptus, Eastern Roman Empire
| style="font-size:85%"|—
|style="font-size:85%"| Greek. In opposition to Pope Boniface II. Candidate of the Byzantine party, elected by the majority of the cardinals and recognized by Constantinople, he died less than a month after his election.

7th century

8th century 

|-  style="vertical-align:top; background:#ccc;"
| style="text-align:center;" | —
| 22 March 752 –25 March 752
|
| Stephen
| Stephanus
| style="font-size:85%"|c. 700 Rome, Duchy of Rome(formally Eastern Roman Empire)
| style="font-size:85%"|52 / 52
| style="font-size:85%"|Roman. Previously known as Stephen II. Died three days after his election, having never received episcopal consecration. Some lists still include him. The Vatican sanctioned his addition in the sixteenth century; removed in 1961. He is no longer considered a pope by the Catholic Church.

9th century

10th century 

|-  style="vertical-align:top; background:#ccc;"
| style="text-align:center;" | —
| October 903 – January 904
| Christopher
| style="font-size:85%"|Rome, Papal States
| style="font-size:85%"|—
| style="font-size:85%"|Italian. In opposition to Leo V.

|-  style="vertical-align:top; background:#ccc;"
| style="text-align:center;" | —
| 6 December 963 –26 February 964
| Leo VIII
| style="font-size:85%"|c. 915 Rome, Papal States
| style="font-size:85%"|48 / 49
|style="font-size:85%"| Italian. Appointed antipope by Emperor Otto in 963 in opposition to John XII and Benedict V. His pontificate after the deposition of Benedict V is considered legitimate by the modern Catholic Church.

|-  style="vertical-align:top; background:#ccc;"
| style="text-align:center;" | —
| July 974 –July 974
| Boniface VII
| style="font-size:85%"|Rome, Papal States
| style="font-size:85%"|—
| style="font-size:85%"|Italian, born Francone Ferucci. In opposition to Benedict VI and Benedict VII.

|-  style="vertical-align:top; background:#ccc;"
| style="text-align:center;" | —
| 20 August 984 –20 July 985
| Boniface VII
| style="font-size:85%"|Rome, Papal States
| style="font-size:85%"|—
| style="font-size:85%"|Italian. In opposition to John XIV and John XV

|-  style="vertical-align:top; background:#ccc;"
| style="text-align:center;" | —
| April 997 –February 998
| John XVI
| style="font-size:85%"|c. 941 Rossanum, Calabria, Italy, Eastern Roman Empire
| style="font-size:85%"|55 / 56 (†60)
| style="font-size:85%"|Greek. In opposition to Gregory V

2nd millennium

11th century 

|-  style="vertical-align:top; background:#ccc;"
| style="text-align:center;" | —
| 12 June 1012 –31 December 1012
| 
| Gregory VI
| Gregorio
| style="font-size:85%"|Rome, Papal States
| style="font-size:85%"|—
| style="font-size:85%"|Italian. In opposition to Benedict VIII

|-  style="vertical-align:top; background:#ccc;"
| style="text-align:center;" | —
| 4 April 1058 – 24 January 1059
| 
| Benedict X
| Giovanni Mincio di Tuscolo
| style="font-size:85%"|Rome, Papal States
| style="font-size:85%"|—
| style="font-size:85%"|Italian. In opposition to Nicholas II.

|-  style="vertical-align:top; background:#ccc;"
| style="text-align:center;" | —
| 30 September 1061 – 1072
| 
| Honorius II
| Pietro Candalus
| style="font-size:85%"|1010 Verona, Holy Roman Empire
| style="font-size:85%"|61 / 72
| style="font-size:85%"|Italian. In opposition to Pope Alexander II

|-  style="vertical-align:top; background:#ccc;"
| style="text-align:center;" | —
| 25 June 1080 – 8 September 1100
| 
| Clement III
| Pietro Cadnalus
| style="font-size:85%"|1010 Verona, Holy Roman Empire
| style="font-size:85%"|61 / 72
| style="font-size:85%"|Italian. In opposition to Pope Gregory VII, Pope Victor III, Pope Urban II and Pope Paschal II.

|-  style="vertical-align:top; background:#ccc;"
| style="text-align:center;" | —
| 8 September 1100 – January 1101
| 
| Theodoric
| Teodorico
| style="font-size:85%"|c. 1030 Rome, Papal States
| style="font-size:85%"|70 / 71
| style="font-size:85%"|Lombard. In opposition to Pope Paschal II

12th century 

|-  style="vertical-align:top; background:#ccc;"
| style="text-align:center;" | —
| January 1101 – February 1102
| 
| Adalbert
| AdalbertoO.S.B.
| style="font-size:85%"|Rome, Papal States
| style="font-size:85%"|—
| style="font-size:85%"|Lombard. In opposition to Pope Paschal II

|-  style="vertical-align:top; background:#ccc;"
| style="text-align:center;" | —
| 8 November 1105 –11 April 1111
| 
| Sylvester IV
| Maguinulf
| style="font-size:85%"|1050 Rome, Papal States
| style="font-size:85%"|49 / 55 (†56)
| style="font-size:85%"|German. In opposition to Paschal II.

|-  style="vertical-align:top; background:#ccc;"
| style="text-align:center;" | —
| 10 March 1118 –20 April 1121
| 
| Gregory VIII
| Maurice Baurdain
| style="font-size:85%"|c. 1060 Limousin, Occitania, France
| style="font-size:85%"|58 / 61 (†77)
| style="font-size:85%"|French (Occitan). In opposition to Gelasius II and Callixtus II.

|-  style="vertical-align:top; background:#ccc;"
| style="text-align:center;" | —
| 16 December 1124–16 December 1124
| 
| Celestine II
| Teobaldo Boccapecora
| style="font-size:85%"|1050 Rome, Papal States
| style="font-size:85%"|74 / 74 (†76)
| style="font-size:85%"|French. In opposition to Honorius II.

|-  style="vertical-align:top; background:#ccc;"
| style="text-align:center;" | —
| 14 February 1130 –25 January 1138
| 
| Anacletus II
| Pietro PierleoniO.S.B.
| style="font-size:85%"|1090 Rome, Papal States
| style="font-size:85%"|40 / 48
| style="font-size:85%"|Italian. In opposition to Innocent II.

|-  style="vertical-align:top; background:#ccc;"
| style="text-align:center;" | —
| 23 March 1138 –25 March 1138
| 
| Victor IV
| Gregorio Conti
| style="font-size:85%"|Rome, Papal States
| style="font-size:85%"|—
| style="font-size:85%"|Italian. In Opposition to Pope Innocent II

|-  style="vertical-align:top; background:#ccc;"
| style="text-align:center;" | —
| 7 September 1159 –20 April 1164
| 
| Victor IV
| Ottaviano dei Crescenzi Ottaviani di Monticelli
| style="font-size:85%"|1095 Rome, Papal States
| style="font-size:85%"|64 / 69
| style="font-size:85%"|Italian. In opposition to Pope Alexander III.

|-  style="vertical-align:top; background:#ccc;"
| style="text-align:center;" | —
| 28 April 1164 –22 September 1168
|
| Paschal III
| Guido di Crema
| style="font-size:85%"|1110 Rome, Papal States
| style="font-size:85%"|54 / 58
| style="font-size:85%"|Italian. In opposition to Alexander III.

|-  style="vertical-align:top; background:#ccc;"
| style="text-align:center;" | —
| 30 September 1168 –29 August 1178
| 
| Callixtus III
| Giovanni di StrumaO.S.B.
| style="font-size:85%"|1090 Rome, Papal States
| style="font-size:85%"|78 / 88
| style="font-size:85%"|Italian. In opposition to Alexander III.

|- style="vertical-align:top; background:#ccc;"
| style="text-align:center;" | —
| 29 September 1179 – January 1180
| 
| Innocent III
| Lando di Sezze (or Lanzo)
| style="font-size:85%"|1120 Sezze, Papal States
| style="font-size:85%"|59 / 60 (†63)
| style="font-size:85%"|Italian. In opposition to Alexander III.

13th century

14th century 

|-  style="vertical-align:top; background:#ccc;"
| style="text-align:center;" | —
| 12 May 1328–25 July 1330
| 
| Nicholas V
| Pietro Rainalducci, O.F.M.
| style="font-size:85%"|1260 Corvaro, Papal States
| style="font-size:85%"|68 / 70 (†73)
| style="font-size:85%"|Italian. In opposition to John XXII.

|-  style="vertical-align:top; background:#ccc;"
| style="text-align:center;" | —
| 20 September 1378 –16 September 1394
| 
| Clement VII
| Robert de Genève
| style="font-size:85%"|1342 Chateau d'Annecy, County of Savoy, H.R.E.
| style="font-size:85%"|36 / 52
| style="font-size:85%"|French. In opposition to Urban VI (1378–89) and Boniface IX (1389–1404)

|-  style="vertical-align:top; background:#ccc;"
| style="text-align:center;" | —
| 28 September 1394 –23 May 1423
| 
| Benedict XIII
| Pedro Martínez de Luna y Pérez de Gotor
| style="font-size:85%"|25 November 1328 Illueca, Aragon
| style="font-size:85%"|66 / 94
| style="font-size:85%"|Spanish. In opposition to Boniface IX (1389–1404), Innocent VII (1404–06), Gregory XII (1406–15), Martin V (1417–31) and Pisan Antipopes Alexander V (1409–10) and John XXIII (1410–15)

15th century 

|-  style="vertical-align:top; background:#ccc;"
| style="text-align:center;" | —
| 30 June 1409 –3 May 1410
| 
| Alexander V
| Pétros Philárgēs,O.F.M.
| style="font-size:85%"|1339 Candia Lomellina, Lombardy, Duchy of Milan
| style="font-size:85%"|70 / 71
| style="font-size:85%"|Greek. Western Schism. In opposition to Gregory XII. Considered a legitimate pope until 1963 and is numbered as such to this day.

|-  style="vertical-align:top; background:#ccc;"
| style="text-align:center;" | —
| 25 May 1410 –30 May 1415
| 
| John XXIII
| Baldassarre Cossa
| style="font-size:85%"|1365 Procida, Naples
| style="font-size:85%"|45 / 50 (†54)
| style="font-size:85%"|Italian. Western Schism. In opposition to Gregory XII. Convened Council of Constance. Abdicated. Became dean of the College of Cardinals in 1417. Was considered a legitimate pope until 1958.

|-  style="vertical-align:top; background:#ccc;"
| style="text-align:center;" | —
| 10 or 20 June 1423 –26 July 1429
| 
| Clement VIII
| Gil Sánchez Muñoz y Carbón
| style="font-size:85%"|1369 Teruel, Aragon
| style="font-size:85%"|54 / 60 (†77)
| style="font-size:85%"|Spanish. Western Schism. In opposition to Martin V.

|-  style="vertical-align:top; background:#ccc;"
| style="text-align:center;" | 
| 1424 – 1429
| 
| Antipope Benedict XIV
| Bernard Garnier
| style="font-size:85%"|France
| style="font-size:85%"|
| style="font-size:85%"| Two antipope claimants

|-  style="vertical-align:top; background:#ccc;"
| style="text-align:center;" | 
| 1430 – 1437
| 
| Antipope Benedict XIV
| Jean Carrier
| style="font-size:85%"|France
| style="font-size:85%"|
| style="font-size:85%"| Two antipope claimants

|-  style="vertical-align:top; background:#ccc;"
| style="text-align:center;" | —
| 5 November 1439 –7 April 1449
| 
| Felix V
| Amadeus
| style="font-size:85%"|4 September 1383 Chambéry, France
| style="font-size:85%"|56 / 65 (†67)
| style="font-size:85%"|French. In opposition to Eugene IV and Nicholas V. Also ruled as count of Savoy.

16th century

17th century

18th century

19th century

20th century 

|-

3rd millennium

21st century 

 Longest-living pope on record. Died on 31 December 2022, in Vatican.

Religious orders 

51 popes and 6 antipopes (in italics) have been members of religious orders, including 12 members of third orders. They are listed by order as follows:

Numbering of popes 

Regnal numbers follow the usual convention for European monarchs.  The first pope who chooses a unique name is not usually identified by ordinals, John Paul I being the exception. Antipopes are treated as pretenders, and their numbers are reused by those considered to be legitimate popes. However, there are anomalies in the numbering of the popes. Several numbers were mistakenly increased in the Middle Ages because the records were misunderstood. Several antipopes were also kept in the sequence, either by mistake or because they were previously considered to be true popes.

 Alexander: Antipope Alexander V (1409–1410) was listed in the Annuario Pontificio as a legitimate pope until the 20th century, when the Pisan popes were reclassified as antipopes. There had already been three more Alexanders by then, so there is now a gap in the numbering sequence.
 Donus: The name has only been used by one pope. The apocryphal Pope Donus II resulted from confusion between the Latin word dominus (lord) and the name Donus.
 Felix: Antipope Felix II (356–357) was kept in the numbering sequence.
 John: The numbering of the Johns is particularly confused. In the modern sequence, the Johns are identified by the numbers they used during their reigns.
 Antipope John XVI (997–998) was kept in the numbering sequence.
 Pope John XXI (1276–1277) chose to skip the number XX, believing that there had been another John between XIV and XV. In reality, John XIV had been counted twice.
 By the 16th century, the numbering error had been conflated with legends about a female Pope Joan, whom some authors called John VIII. She was never listed in the Annuario Pontificio.
 Antipope John XXIII (1410–1415) was listed in the Annuario Pontificio as a legitimate pope until the 20th century. After the Pisan popes were classified as antipopes, Pope John XXIII (1958–1963) chose to reuse the number, citing "twenty-two [sic] Johns of indisputable legitimacy."
 Martin: Pope Martin I (649–655) is followed by Martin IV (1281–1285). Due to the similarity between the Latin names Marinus and Martinus, Marinus I and Marinus II were mistakenly considered to be Martin II and III.
 Stephen: Pope-elect Stephen (752) died before being consecrated. He was previously known as Stephen II, but the Vatican removed him from the official list of popes in 1961. The remaining Stephens are now numbered Pope Stephen II (752–757) to Pope Stephen IX (1057–1058).

See also 

Annuario Pontificio
History of the papacy
Index of Vatican City-related articles
Legends surrounding the papacy
Liber Pontificalis
Papal name
Papal appointment
Pope John (numbering)
Prophecy of the Popes

Lists 

List of canonised popes
List of murdered popes
List of popes by nationality
List of popes from the Borgia family
List of popes from the Conti family
List of popes from the Medici family
List of popes sorted alphabetically
List of sexually active popes
List of Sovereigns of the Vatican City State
List of popes (graphical)

Notes

References

Sources 

 The Early Papacy: To the Synod of Chalcedon in 451, Adrian Fortescue, Ignatius Press, 2008.
 The Oxford Dictionary of Popes, John N.D. Kelly, Oxford University Press, 1986.
 Catholicism, Henri de Lubac, Ignatius Press, 1988.
 Rome and the Eastern Churches, Aidan Nichols, Ignatius Press, 2010.
 I Papi. Venti secoli di storia, Pontificia Amministrazione della Patriarcale Basilica di San Paolo, Libreria Editrice Vaticana, 2002.
 Rome Sweet Home, Scott Hahn, Ignatius Press, 1993.
 Enciclopedia dei Papi, AA.VV., Istituto dell'Enciclopedia italiana, 2000.

External links 
Catholic Online: The List of Popes
Popes & Anti-Popes (2019 archived copy)

Lists of clerics
Lists of monarchs
Lists of patriarchs
Lists of Christian religious leaders
 
Portraits of popes

nn:Pave#Liste over pavar